The Finnish Museum of Horology is a horological museum located in exhibition centre WeeGee house in Tapiola, Espoo.

References

External links 
 Website
 The Finnish Museum of Horology at museot.fi

Horological museums
Museums in Uusimaa